Leslie Thornton (born 1951) is an American avant-garde filmmaker and artist.

Life
Leslie Thornton was born in 1951 in Knoxville, Tennessee, and grew up in Oak Ridge, Tennessee, and Schenectady, New York. Both her father and grandfather worked on the Manhattan Project, but due to the project's high level of secrecy, neither knew of the other's involvement until many years later. Thornton learned as an adult, and as a result the atomic bomb and themes of apocalypse appear in some of her works (most notably, Peggy and Fred in Hell and Let Me Count the Ways, Minus 10, 9, 8, and 7...). She first developed an interest in film as a teenager when she frequented experimental cinema screenings at her local Unitarian Church in Schenectady. Attending Tufts University as an undergraduate from 1969 until 1971, Thornton then transferred to the State University of New York at Buffalo where she studied painting under Seymour Drumlevitch and film under Hollis Frampton, Paul Sharits, Stan Brakhage, and Peter Kubelka. After earning a Bachelor of Fine Arts in painting at SUNY-Buffalo in 1973, she continued on to graduate work. Thornton earned a Master of Fine Arts in Painting from The Hartford Art School in 1976, and then studied film at the graduate level at the Massachusetts Institute of Technology in 1975 under Richard Leacock and Ed Pincus. Currently she works as a professor of Modern Culture and Media at Brown University and teaches at the European Graduate School. She lives in both Providence, Rhode Island, and New York City with her partner, artist and scholar Thomas Zummer.

Style
Thornton began painting as a teenager, during "a period of Minimalism moving into Conceptualism." She recalls that lineage as a prominent part of her own work, where visually,  "The paintings were moving towards white but there was some kind of grid that kept being laid down and re-established." Scholar Thomas Zummer characterizes those early paintings through their grids: "Thornton's paintings organized a sensual, expressionist hand into strict formal geometric mappings. These works begin with a painterly sensuality set within and against a series of structural grids, so that there is a constant between expressivity and the ineffable." But as her practice developed, he notes, "Painting was a vessel incapable of the containment of the sensate. Language, gesture, emotion the random and inexplicable things and occurrences of the world were among her subjects; painting seemed insufficient. It was a matter of finding an appropriate instrument for her investigations". Painting's insufficiency led Thornton to her first venture in filmmaking, X-TRACTS, in 1975 while studying painting at the Hartford School of Art (though she was familiar with film theory from her undergraduate coursework at SUNY-Buffalo). After graduating, she abandoned painting in favor of filmmaking, which felt to her, despite Zummer's claims, entirely unrelated to her previous practice: "I dropped thinking of what I had been doing with painting once I started the process of making film. I didn't draw comparisons though I probably could now, if I thought about it." Filmmaking has dominated her work since this transition, though she recently began painting again as a hobby.

Thornton's filmography includes 16mm, video, HD video, HDV, digital video and 2K video. Employing archival materials, text, found footage and soundtrack, the body of work as a whole explores themes of language, childhood, nuclear war, technology, ethnography, seriality and narrative structure. These themes have been collectively described as "an investigation in the production of meaning through media." In her words, "I see myself as writing with media, and I position the viewer as an active reader, not a consumer. The goal is not a product, but shared thought." Throughout her career, Thornton has received significant critical acclaim for her work—particularly for her serial Peggy and Fred in Hell, and was the only woman experimental filmmaker included in Cahiers du cinéma's "60 Most Important American Directors" issue. In addition to acclaim from critics, Thornton has received many awards and her work is included in the collections of many museums.

Peggy and Fred in Hell
Thornton's first widely-recognized and perhaps still best-known work is the epic serial Peggy and Fred in Hell. The project began as she was moving into a new apartment in San Francisco and the two children who lived upstairs, Janis and Donald Reading, came to offer help. While carrying her things, they saw the film equipment and wanted to be recorded (the resulting material would eventually become part of the serial's first episode, Peggy and Fred in Hell: The Prologue). Thornton immediately fell in love with their performance and chose them as the protagonists for her then-upcoming Peggy and Fred in Hell. In a 1990 essay that acts as a descriptive companion to the serial, "We Ground Things, Now, On a Moving Earth", Thornton describes the premise where a camera tracks two children "raised by television" who live in a "post-apocalyptic splendor," "adrift in the detritus of prior cultures." These children, Peggy and Fred, wander through Hell (filmed primarily in California, but also across the United States) and fill their time learning "how to make avocado dip, getting lost in their own house, receiving imaginary phone calls and death threats, deciding what things are for," and monitoring the television sets that fill their homes. Though the Readings' performances before the camera are unscripted, Thornton provides them with "a fictional construct…having been told only their names, that they are adults, that this is their house, that they are hungry.” The conditions result in improvisations that Thornton calls "a true interaction in a fictionalized environment." Recorded between 1981 and 1988, the footage of the children was then taken to the editing room where Thornton spliced their improvisations with archival materials, including but not limited to creation myths recorded by Franz Boas, excerpts from the Bible, outtakes from Universal newsreels, B-roll of factories from the Industrial Revolution, Thomas Edison’s archive, raw footage from the moon landing, and weather radar tapes.

The resulting works were released between 1984 and 2013 in a series of 17 episodes, which range in time from two to 20 minutes each, in format from 16 mm film to analog video to digital video, and are almost entirely in black and white with the exception of a short clip in from the 1996 episode Whirling. Later episodes introduced a variety of digital effects, including text crawls, graphic overlays, and rippling images. Thornton emphasizes the serial's "modular format," and encourages that the episodes be played in any order or simultaneously. The themes in the serial as a whole include science fiction, ethnography, language acquisition, narrative form, the convergence of technology and the human consciousness, and the history of American cinema. She referred to the project as "ongoing and open-ended" until the release of The Fold in 2013.

Critics have praised Peggy and Fred in Hell since its beginning in 1984.  Both The Village Voice and Cahiers du Cinéma placed the serial on their "Best Films of the Year: 1989" lists, and Senses of Cinema included it on their "50 Best films of 2004" (for the version Peggy and Fred in Hell: Beginning, Middle, End). The Pacific Film Archive began a restoration of a final-cut iteration of the serial in 2008. Film critic Jonathan Rosenbaum, who has praised Thornton's work elsewhere, called Peggy and Fred in Hell both "highly idiosyncratic and deeply creepy," and "the most exciting recent work in the American avant-garde, a saga that raises questions about everything while making everything seem very strange."

Filmography

{| class="wikitable plainrowheaders" style="width: 90%"
! style="width: 5%;" scope="col" | Year !! style="width: 10%;" scope="col" | Title !! style="width: 5%;" scope="col" | Format !! style="width: 5%;" scope="col" | Length !! style="width: 25%;" scope="col" | 
|-
| scope="row" | 1974 || scope="row" style="background: #fffafa;" | Face || S-8mm || 10 minutes || Color; silent 
|-
| scope="row" | 1975 || scope="row" style="background: #fffafa;" | X-TRACTS || 16mm || 9 minutes || Black-and-white
|-
| scope="row" | 1976 || scope="row" style="background: #fffafa;" | All Right You Guys || 16mm|| 16 minutes || Black-and-white
|-
| scope="row" | 1977 || scope="row" style="background: #fffafa;" | Howard || 16mm || 30 minutes || Black-and-white
|-
| scope="row" | 1977 || scope="row" style="background: #fffafa;" | Fiddlers in May || 16mm || 28 minutes || Color; produced for CPTV
|-
| scope="row" | 1979 || scope="row" style="background: #fffafa;" | Minutiae || 16mm || 55 minutes || Color
|-
| scope="row" | 1981 || scope="row" style="background: #fffafa;" | noexitkiddo || 16mm || 30 minutes || Color
|-
| scope="row" | 1981 || scope="row" style="background: #fffafa;" | Jennifer, Where Are You? || 16mm || 10 minutes || Color
|-
| scope="row" | 1983 || scope="row" style="background: #fffafa;" | Oh, China, Oh || 16mm || 3 minutes || Black-and-white
|-
| scope="row" | 1984 || scope="row" style="background: #ffdfbf;" | Peggy and Fred in Hell: The Prologue || 16mm || 21 minutes || Black-and-White
|-
| scope="row" | 1987 || scope="row" style="background: #fffafa;" | 1,001 Eyes || Multimedia || Installation || 
|-
| scope="row" | 1987 || scope="row" style="background: #fffafa;" | She Had He So He Do He To Her || 16mm || 5 minutes || Color
|-
| scope="row" | 1987 || scope="row" style="background: #ffdfbf;" | Peggy and Fred in Kansas || 16mm; video || 11 minutes || Black-and-white
|-
| scope="row" | 1988 || scope="row" style="background: #fffafa;" | There Was An Unseen Cloud Moving || Video || 60 minutes || Color
|-
| scope="row" | 1988 || scope="row" style="background: #ffdfbf;" | Peggy and Fred and Pete || Video || 23 minutes || Sepia; black-and-white
|-
| scope="row" | 1989 || scope="row" style="background: #ffdfbf;" | [Dung Smoke Enters The Palace] || 16mm; video || 16 minutes || Black-and-white
|-
| scope="row" | 1993 || scope="row" style="background: #ffdfbf;" | Introduction to the So-Called Duck Factory || 16mm; video || 7 minutes || Black-and-white
|-
| scope="row" | 1993 || scope="row" style="background: #fffafa;" | Strange Space || Video || 4 minutes || Color; co-produced with Ron Vawter
|-
| scope="row" | 1994 || scope="row" style="background: #ffdfbf;" | The Last Time I Saw Ron || Video || 12 minutes || Color
|-
| scope="row" | 1996 || scope="row" style="background: #ffdfbf;" | Whirling || 16mm || 2 minutes || Black-and-white
|-
| scope="row" | 1996 || scope="row" style="background: #ffdfbf;" | The Problem So Far || 16mm; video || 7 minutes || Black-and-white
|-
| scope="row" | 1996 || scope="row" style="background: #fffafa;" | Old Worldy || Video || 30 minutes || Black-and-White
|-
| scope="row" | 1997 || scope="row" style="background: #fffafa;" | ...or lost || 16mm || 7 minutes || Color
|-
| scope="row" | 1998 || scope="row" style="background: #fffafa;" | The Haunted Swing || Video || 16 minutes || Color
|-
| scope="row" | 1999 || scope="row" style="background: #fffafa;" | Another Worldy || 16mm || 24 minutes || Color
|-
| scope="row" | 1999 || scope="row" style="background: #ffdfbf;" | Chimp For Normal Short || 16mm || 7 minutes || Sepia
|-
| scope="row" | 2000 || scope="row" style="background: #ffdfbf;" | Bedtime || Video || 4 minutes || Black-and-White
|-
| scope="row" | 2000 || scope="row" style="background: #ffdfbf;" | Quickly, Yet Too Slowly' || Multimedia || Installation || Installation (in Presumés Innocent, Musée d'art contemporain de Bordeaux, France, June 8-October 1, 2000)
|-
| scope="row" | 2001 || scope="row" style="background: #ffdfbf;" | Have a Nice Day Alone || 16mm; video || 7 minutes || Black-and-White
|-
| scope="row" | 2001 || scope="row" style="background: #ffdfbf;" | The Splendor || Video || 2 minutes || Black-and-White
|-
| scope="row" | 2002 || scope="row" style="background: #fffafa;" | Document of an Installation || Video || 6 minutes || Black-and-White; color
|-
| scope="row" | 2002 || scope="row" style="background: #ffdfbf;" | Bedtime v.2 || Video || 7 minutes || Black-and-White
|-
| scope="row" | 2002 || scope="row" style="background: #ffdfbf;" | Peggy and Fred on Television || Video || Single channel variant; 105 minutes || Black-and-White; color; sepia
|-
| scope="row" | 2002 || scope="row" style="background: #ffdfbf;" | The 10,000 Hills of Language || Multimedia || Installation || Installation
|-
| scope="row" | 2003 || scope="row" style="background: #ffdfbf;" | Paradise Crushed || Video || 7 minutes || Black-and-White
|-
| scope="row" | 2003 || scope="row" style="background: #ffdfbf;" | Origin || Video || 4 minutes || Color
|-
| scope="row" | 2003 || scope="row" style="background: #ffdfbf;" | Temporary Modern || Video || 4 minutes || Color
|-
| scope="row" | 2004 || scope="row" style="background: #fffafa;" | Let Me Count the Ways, Minus 10, 9, 8, and 7... || Video || 20 minutes || Color
|-
| scope="row" | 2005 || scope="row" style="background: #ffdfbf;" | End in A New World || HDV || 3 minutes || Color
|-
| scope="row" | 2005 || scope="row" style="background: #fffafa;" | Photography is Easy || Video || 5 minutes || Color
|-
| scope="row" | 2006 || scope="row" style="background: #fffafa;" | Sahara Mojave || HDV || 11 minutes || Color
|-
| scope="row" | 2006 || scope="row" style="background: #fffafa;" | Let Me Count the Ways: Minus 6 || HDV || 1 minutes || Black-and-white
|-
| scope="row" | 2006 || scope="row" style="background: #fffafa;" | Data Tent || Multimedia || Installation || Multimedia
|-
| scope="row" | 2007 || scope="row" style="background: #fffafa;" | As the World Turns || HDV || 3 minutes || Color
|-
| scope="row" | 2007 || scope="row" style="background: #fffafa;" | Sahara Mojave (version 2) || HDV || 12 minutes || Color
|-
| scope="row" | 2007 || scope="row" style="background: #fffafa;" | Minus 9 || Multimedia || Installation || Multimedia
|-
| scope="row" | 2006 || scope="row" style="background: #ffdfbf;" | The Expiration || Video || 2 minutes || Color
|-
| scope="row" | 2008 || scope="row" style="background: #fffafa;" | Novel City || Video || 7 minutes || Color
|-
| scope="row" | 2009 || scope="row" style="background: #fffafa;" | BOB-BOB || Video || Installation|| Color
|-
| scope="row" | 2009 || scope="row" style="background: #fffafa;" | ((((( ))))) || HD Video || 9 minutes || Color
|-
| scope="row" | 2010 || scope="row" style="background: #fffafa;" | Photography is Easy (version 2) || Video || 6 minutes || Color
|-
| scope="row" | 2010 || scope="row" style="background: #fffafa;" | Binocular || Video installation || Installation || Color
|-
| scope="row" | 2010 || scope="row" style="background: #fffafa;" | Golden Eyes || HD Video || 3 minutes || Color
|-
| scope="row" | 2010 || scope="row" style="background: #fffafa;" | Migrating Forms Trailer || HD video loop || 1 minutes || Color
|-
| scope="row" | 2011 || scope="row" style="background: #fffafa;" | Twice Removed || HD video || 11 minutes || Color
|-
| scope="row" | 2012 || scope="row" style="background: #fffafa;" | SONGS One Two Three || HD video || 14 minutes || Color
|-
| scope="row" | 2013 || scope="row" style="background: #fffafa;" | SNAPS: Elephant Pair || HD video || 2 minutes || Color
|-
| scope="row" | 2013 || scope="row" style="background: #fffafa;" | SNAPS: Oil/Air || 2K video || 2 minutes || Color
|-
| scope="row" | 2013 || scope="row" style="background: #fffafa;" | LUNA 1905 || HD video || 5 minutes || Black-and-white
|-
| scope="row" | 2013 || scope="row" style="background: #fffafa;" | LUNA Snow || HD video || 2 minutes || Color
|-
| scope="row" | 2013 || scope="row" style="background: #fffafa;" | LUNA Heaven || HD video || 8 minutes || Color
|-
| scope="row" | 2013 || scope="row" style="background: #ffdfbf;" | Peggy and Fred in Hell: The Fold || Digital projection; stacks of CRT monitors || 95 minutes || Color; sepia; black-and-white
|-
| scope="row" | 2013 || scope="row" style="background: #ffdfbf;" | The Fold || Digital video || 2 minutes || Color; black-and-white
|-
| scope="row" | 2013 || scope="row" style="background: #fffafa;" | LUNA Trance || Video triptych with installation environment || 12 minute loop || Color
|-
| scope="row" | 2013 || scope="row" style="background: #fffafa;" | The Animates: Oil/Air/Water || 2K video || 7 minutes || Color
|-
| scope="row" | 2013 || scope="row" style="background: #fffafa;" | Philosophers Walk on the Sublime || Digital video || 16 minutes || Color
|-
| scope="row" | Ongoing || scope="row" style="background: #fffafa;" | The Great Invisible || 16mm; HD video || 90 minutes || Color; production began in 2002
|-
| scope="row" | Ongoing || scope="row" style="background: #fffafa;" | What I Learned of China From The Sky || Multi-screen digital video installation || Installation || Color
|}

Awards
Thornton has received many awards for her film and video work throughout her career, including:

Iowa Film Festival, Honorable Mention (for X-TRACTS), 1976
San Francisco Art Institute Film Festival, Honorable Mention (for X-TRACTS), 1980
Athens International Film Festival, Special Merit Award (for Jennifer, Where Are You?), 1981
Athens International Film Festival, Special Merit Award (for Adynata), 1984
Rhode Island Council on the Arts, Grant (for Peggy and Fred in Hell), 1985
National Endowment for the Arts, Grants, 1981, 1992, 1995
The Jerome Foundation, Grants, 1985, 1988, 1992
New York State Council on the Arts, Grants, 1985, 1989
Art Matters, Inc., Grants, 1987, 1988, 1993
The Rockefeller Foundation, Fellowships, 1988, 1990, 1997
New York Foundation for the Arts, Fellowships, 1988, 1999
The Alpert Awards in the Arts, 1995 (first Media Arts Recipient)
New England Film and Video Festival, Judges' Special Merit Award (for The Last Time I Saw Ron), 1995
Three Rivers Arts Festival, First Prize: Best of Show/Video Category (for The Last Time I Saw Ron), 1995
The Maya Deren Award for Independent Film and Video Artists, 1996
Hugo Boss Award of the Solomon R. Guggenheim Museum, Nominee, 1998
Stephen Holden's "Best Films on 1999" (for Another Worldy), New York Times, 2000
Rainbow Program, LAB Artist Outreach Program, Participating Artist, 2005
Onion City Film Festival, Second Place (for Let Me Count the Ways Minus 10, 9, 8, 7..., 2005
Anonymous Was A Woman, Grant, 2008
Brown University, Humanities Research Fund, 2009
Film Comment, "Best of the Decade Avant-Garde Films" (for Let Me Count the Ways), 2010
Jonathan Rosenbaum, "All Time Top 1000 Films", (for Adynata), 2010

Collections and representation
Thorton is represented by the Winkleman Gallery in New York, New York and Unit 17 in Vancouver, Canada and distributed by Elisabeth de Brabant, the DIA Foundation, Video Data Bank, Electronic Arts Intermix, Women Make Movies, New York Film Makers Co-op, Light Cone, and LUX. In addition to numerous private collections, Thornton's pieces are in the collections of the following institutions:

Smithsonian American Art Museum
Jeu de paume
Fundacion La Laboral
Fundacion Salamancia Ciudad de Cultura
Museum of Modern Art, Fundacio la Caixa
Centre Pompidou
Pacific Film Archive
Newark Museum
Arteleku/Donostia-San Sebastian
Parabola Arts Foundation
Fundació Antoni Tàpies
Harvard University
School of the Art Institute of Chicago
Ecole Nationale Supieure des Beaux Arts
Bezalel Academy of Arts and Design
University of Notre Dame
Queen's University
New York University
Princeton University
Carnegie Mellon University
California Institute of the Arts
University of California, San Diego
Walker Art Center

Further reading
Adams, Sitney P., "The End of the 20th Century”, Visionary Film: The American Avant-Garde, 1943-2000, 3rd edition, Oxford: Oxford University Press, 2002
Arthur, Paul, "Lost and Found: American Avant-Garde Film in the Eighties", A Passage Illuminated: the American Avant-garde Film, 1980-1990, Amsterdam: Stichting Mecano, 1991
Doane, Mary Anne, "In the Ruins of the Image: The Works of Leslie Thornton", Women’s Experimental Cinema: Critical Frameworks, ed. Robin Blaetz, Durham: Duke University Press, 2007
Doane, Mary Anne, “The Retreat of Signs and the Failure of Words: Leslie Thornton’s Adynata”, Femmes Fatales: Feminism, Film Theory, Psychoanalysis, New York: Routledge, 1991
Halter, Ed. "Hell is for Children", Artforum, September 2012
Russell, Catherine, “Archival Apocalypse: Found Footage as Ethnography”, Experimental Ethnography: The Work of Film in the Age of Video, Durham: Duke University Press, 1999
Russell, Catherine, “The Ethnographic Impulse in the Films of Peggy Ahwesh, Su Friedrich, and Leslie Thornton", The New American Cinema, ed. Jon Lewis. Durham and London: Duke University Press, 1998
Thornton, Leslie, "We Ground Things, Now, On a Moving Earth", "Motion Picture", Volume 3, No. 1, 1990
Thornton, Leslie, “The Extent of My Ignorance So Far”, Outsider: Films on India 1950-1990, ed. Shanay Jhaveri, Mumbai: The Shoestring Publisher, 2009
Voorhuis, Nelly, "The Works of Leslie Thornton", Andere Sinema, 1992
Wees, William C., "Carrying On: Leslie Thornton, Su Friedrich, Abigail Child and American Avant-Garde Film in the Eighties”, Canadian Journal of Film Studies, Volume 10, No. 1, 2002
Wees, William C., "No More Giants", Women & Experimental Filmmaking'', ed. Jean Petrolle and Virginia Wright Wexman, Chicago: University of Illinois, 2005

External links
Leslie Thornton on Vimeo
Leslie Thornton’s videos on Ubu
Leslie Thornton at the Whitney Museum of American Art
Leslie Thornton's curriculum vitae, exhibition history, interviews from Winkleman Gallery
Leslie Thornton's 35 Years of Radical Filmmaking - Frieze

References

American experimental filmmakers
American women cinematographers
American cinematographers
American documentary filmmakers
Brown University faculty
1951 births
Living people
American film editors
Collage filmmakers
American women academics
21st-century American women
American women documentary filmmakers